Apatema parodia is a moth of the family Autostichidae. It is found in Spain and Morocco.

References

Moths described in 1988
Apatema
Moths of Europe
Moths of Africa